Lethal Weapons of Love and Passion is a Hong Kong television series based on Huang Yi's novel Fuyu Fanyun. It was released overseas in December 2005 and broadcast on TVB in January 2006.

Synopsis
The two sharpest weapons in the world,
The Rain-Ceasing Sword and the Cloud Ruling Sabre!
Carry the burdens of ethnic conflicts.

Pong Ban (Derek Kok) mercilessly defeated three monks who protected the Rain-Ceasing Sword. The surviving monk took the sword and fled when Long Fan-Wan (David Chiang) arrives to stop Pong Ban. The monk then was later found by Hon Pak (Bosco Wong), who presented it to Yin Wong.

It is set during the early Ming Dynasty, after the overthrow of the Mongol Yuan Dynasty. Fung Heng-Lit (Raymond Lam), the Mongol prince, lost his childhood memories during a massacre by Emperor Zhu. Heng-Lit escaped the massacre and grew up in China, where he becomes the chief of a clan. Pong Ban tries, by all means, to regain Heng-Lit's childhood memory and groom him into being a prince, hoping that Heng-Lit may lead the Mongol rebels in a campaign to overthrow the Ming Dynasty. However, Heng-Lit has his own dream, in which the Mongols and the Han Chinese live together in harmony.

Cast
 Note: Some of the characters' names are in Cantonese romanisation.

Viewership ratings

Awards and nominations
39th TVB Anniversary Awards (2006)
 "Best Drama"

References

External links
TVB.com Lethal Weapons of Love and Passion - Official Website 

TVB dramas
Hong Kong wuxia television series
Adaptations of works by Huang Yi
2006 Hong Kong television series debuts
2006 Hong Kong television series endings
Television series set in the Ming dynasty
Television shows based on Chinese novels